Cerioidini is a widespread tribe of around 222 species of hoverfly.
Cerioidini are mistaken for wasps for which they are effective mimic.
Cerioidini have antennae with a terminal style  and have somewhat elongate and basally constricted abdomens, only slightly in Ceriana, but pronounced in most Sphiximorpha; and Polybiomyia, and extremely  in Monoceromyia. 
Larvae live mostly within tree sap associated with tree wounds or putrefying pockets of water in tree cavities.

Description
This family is distinguished by anatomy and coloration that has evolved to be  wasp mimics. The antennae are long and thin with a terminal arista (see gallery) suggestive of wasp antennae that are also long. The arista of the antennae is terminal. The elongate antennae has arisen independently in other genera such as Mocrodon although in that genera the arista is not terminal. The flagellum is always elongate while the scape and pedicel are elongated in different ratios that are helpful in distinguishing the various genera. an elongation of the front, the frontal prominence adds to the elongation of the antennae but is reduced or inconspicuous in some genera (see table below)The face is elongated with coloring that sometimes has the appearance of the wasp mandibles. These flies have no mandibles.  The abdomen is elongated often constricted in the first and/or second segments (see table below). The anterior half of the wing is commonly darkly colored while the posterior half is usually clear. The effect is the appearance of a dark forewing and a clear hind wing, as in wasps. When captured, the fly also has some behavioural mimicry, such as a stinging motion of the abdomen. These flies have no actual stinger. The overall coloration is very wasp-like, often black with yellow rings on the abdomen and strong markings on the thorax and face.
Wing venation characteristics are of taxonomic value. The cross-vein r-m  is at or beyond the middle of  the discal cell. Cells r1 and r2+3 are open, while cell r4+5 is closed near the margin of the wing. Vein R4+5 can be straight, looping with or without a spur vein.

Gallery

Genera characteristics

References 

Eristalinae
Diptera tribes
Brachycera tribes